Sehol or previously, Sol, is a Chinese car brand launched on April 24, 2018 by a SEAT and JAC Volkswagen Automotive Co., Ltd. joint venture.

History 
The original name Sol itself derives from the word sol which in Spanish stands for sun and pays a tribute from one part to the Spanish roots of the brand and on the other part to renewable energy powered vehicles planned to make up its range. The brand comes as a compromise among all parts in a stance where the original plan included the direct use of the SEAT brand name with the Chinese local authorities negating in a change of mind and calling for a whole new local brand to be launched.

Recent lift of caps on foreign car makers controlling their electric vehicle joint ventures in China, however the car company has pushed Volkswagen Group examining a buyout of their Chinese partner JAC Motors and subsequently their formed joint venture.

As of 2020, JAC started to rebadge the products under the Jiayue series as Sol vehicles. Resulted in the Sol A5, Sol X4, Sol X7, and Sol X8. The rebadge is in fact a move to move all sedans and crossovers under the Sol brand and leave the Refine brand with MPVs. As of 2021, this name was re-transliterated as 'Sehol' brand.

Products 

 Sehol E10X, an electric city car based on the restyled version of JAC iEV6E.
 Sehol E20X, an electric subcompact crossover with a SEAT-like design based on the JAC Refine S2.
 Sehol X4, a compact crossover based on the JAC Refine S4, with a new front and rear design. An electric vehicle version offered as the Sehol E40X.
 Sehol X6, a compact crossover based on the JAC Refine S5.
 Sehol X7, a midsize crossover based on the JAC Refine S7.
 Sehol X8, a midsize crossover. 
 Sehol A5, a compact liftback sedan.
 Sehol Yao (A5 Plus), an updated sport version of the A5, also it is offered as an electric vehicle model called the Aipao (E50A Pro). 
 Sehol QX, a compact crossover SUV, and is the first brand new car produced under the Sehol name.

Product gallery

References

External links 

Official website

Cars of China
Vehicle manufacturing companies established in 2018
Electric vehicle manufacturers of China
Chinese brands